Gandha: the Hindi or Sanskrit word गंध, meaning smell or fragrance (see wiktionary).

Gandha may also refer to:
 Gandha (film), a 2009 Marathi-language Indian film
 Gandha-Woundou, a town in northern Guinea
 Gandhamardhan hills, is a hill in Odisha.

See also 
 Gandhi (disambiguation)
 Gandhara